The National Housing Authority (NHA) is a government agency responsible for public housing in the Philippines.  Established on July 31, 1975, it is organized as a government-owned and controlled corporation under the Department of Human Settlements and Urban Development as an attached agency.

List of general managers
Gaudencio V. Tobias
Raymundo R. Dizon Jr. (–1989)
Monico Jacob (1989–)
Roberto Balao
Angelo F. Leynes (1998–2001)
Edgardo D. Pamintuan (2001–2004)
Federico Laxa (2004–2010)
Chito M. Cruz (2010–2015)
Sinforoso R. Pagunsan (2015–2016)
Marcelino P. Escalada Jr. (2016–2022)
Joeben A. Tai (2022–present)

References

External links
Official Website

Housing in the Philippines
Public housing in the Philippines
Real estate in the Philippines
Establishments by Philippine presidential decree
Government-owned and controlled corporations of the Philippines